Berbeşti may refer to several places in Romania:

 Berbești, a town in Vâlcea County
 Berbeşti, a village in Laloșu Commune, Vâlcea County
 Berbeşti, a village in Giuleşti Commune, Maramureș County